ic! berlin brillen GmbH is a German eyewear company based in Berlin. The company was founded in 1996 by Ralph Anderl.

ic! berlin produces eyewear from 0.5mm thick stainless spring steel sheet metal, using a hinge design which avoids the use of any screws, welds, or glue in the construction of their frames.

Foundation of company

In 1996 Anderl joined Philipp Haffmans and Harald Gottschling to help market their idea for screwless sheet metal eyewear in Berlin. Unable to sell the idea, the trio founded HGA Gesellschaft to produce and market eyewear under the brand ic! brille (pronounced "I See Brille"). The first frame to be produced was ‘Jack’, weighing 20 grams, with an initial run of 50 pieces.

ic! berlin

ic! brille became ic! berlin in late 1997. Starting in a small apartment with a shop front in Max-Beer-Straße in Berlin-Mitte, ic! berlin quickly expanded into the neighbouring apartments before moving to the nearby Backfabrik in 2005.

While Haffmans and Gottschling focused on design and production, Anderl would take control of finance, organisation and distribution. Riding his bike all over Berlin, Anderl would visit potential clients and show product samples which he kept in extra pockets he had sewn into his coat. This strategy was repeated at ic! berlin’s first appearances at the Optika optical fair Cologne in 1997 and the following year at Mido in Milan: unable to secure a stand, Anderl would walk around the exhibition centre with a trench coat full of ic! berlin samples, much like those used by counterfeit watch sellers.

After Milan, ic! berlin was gifted a small stand and showed officially for the first time at Silmo Paris.

In 2003 the trio split, with Anderl remaining at ic! berlin as the sole Managing Director.

Under Anderl, ic! berlin has expanded into fashion, launching a line of jeans and collaborating with other designers and fashion labels such as [Kix], [Bathing Ape], [Luisa Hecking] and [Superfine]. In 2013 German artist and entertainer [Friedrich Lichtenstein] took up residency at ic! berlin an [ornamental hermit].

Today ic! berlin has over 180 employees worldwide with subsidiaries in Berlin, New York and Tokyo. The head office has recently moved from their Backfabrik location near Alexanderplatz, to a bigger location in the Marzahn-Hellersdorf district of Berlin. Design, production, dispatch, sales, marketing and service all continue to happen under the one roof.

Awards

The company has received various awards for their product designs and technological achievements, including:

2008	Golden Silmo Eyewear Award, France/Paris  
2008	Eyewear of the Year 2009/IOFT, Tokyo/Japan  
2009	Eyewear of the Year 2010/IOFT, Tokyo/Japan  
2010	Eyewear of the Year 2011/IOFT, Tokyo/Japan

References 

 http://www.cicero.de/kapital/ralph-anderl-ic-berlin-modelglatze-brillen-design/46617 
 http://www.uni-hildesheim.de/media/fb2/dekanat/ArbeitsfeldKultur/Ralph_Anderl_%C3%BCberarbeitet.pdf
 http://www.vogue.it/en/talents/news/2010/12/ic-berlin

External links 
 Sleek Magazine video interview with director Ralph Anderl
 Company history and interview on mivision.com.au

Eyewear companies of Germany
Companies based in Berlin
Eyewear brands of Germany